The secretary of state of Arkansas is one of the elected constitutional officers of the U.S. state of Arkansas.

The current Secretary of State is Republican John Thurston, former Arkansas land commissioner from Pulaski County in central Arkansas.

Organization
The secretary of state's office is composed of seven divisions:

The Building & Grounds Division maintains the Arkansas State Capitol and its surrounding grounds and gardens.
The Business & Commercial Services Division is responsible for filing liens pursuant to the Uniform Commercial Code, registering business entities and trademarks, collecting the state franchise tax, and licensing notaries public.
The Communications & Education Division provides public education about civics and the History of Arkansas, and produces various state publications.
The Elections Division administers elections, regulates campaign finance and lobbying, and ensures compliance with state and federal election laws.
The Fiscal Office deals with the internal financial, logistical, and personnel matters of the Office of the Secretary of State.  They also distribute the Arkansas and United States flag.
The secretary also runs the State Capitol gift shop.
The State Capitol Police provide security for the State Capitol building and police services for the Capitol Complex.

Other duties
The secretary of state also publishes the state's administrative regulations and the state gazette, the Arkansas Register.

Officeholders
Democrats were elected exclusively to the office of secretary of state from the later Reconstruction era until the retirement of Charlie Daniels to run for State Auditor in 2010, when the first modern-day Republican to hold the office, Mark Martin, was elected. Secretaries of state during the statehood of Arkansas include:

See also

 List of company registers

References

External links

Official
 
 General information
 
 Arkansas: Secretaries of State at The Political Graveyard
 
 

 
1836 establishments in Arkansas
Executive branch of the government of Arkansas
Lists of Arkansas politicians